Sandje Ivanchukov (July 23, 1960 – August 29, 2007) was an American soccer defender who played professionally in the North American Soccer League, American Soccer League and Major Indoor Soccer League.

Youth
Ethnically Kalmyk Mongol, Ivanchukov's father, Saran Ivanchukov, immigrated to the United States from Bulgaria where he had played on the Bulgarian national team.  Born in Neptune Township, New Jersey, Ivanchukov grew up in Howell Township and graduated from Howell High School. He was a 1977 Second Team NSCAA High School All American soccer player.

Professional
In 1978, the Tampa Bay Rowdies drafted Ivanchukov out of high school.  He signed on an amateur contract in order to maintain his eligibility for the Olympic team.  He played two and a half outdoor and one indoor season with Tampa Bay.  In June 1980, the Rowdies traded Ivanchukov to the San Jose Earthquakes.  The Earthquakes released him at the end of the season.  In 1981, he played for the New England Sharks of the American Soccer League.  In the fall of 1981, he joined the Philadelphia Fever of the Major Indoor Soccer League and spent the 1982 season with the Pennsylvania Stoners of the American Soccer League.

National team
Ivanchukov played for the national youth teams.  In 1979, he was a member of the U.S. soccer team at the 1979 Pan American Games.

Ivanchukov later gained his degree from DeVry Technical Institute in computer robotics.

References

External links
 Tampa Bay Rowdies: Sandje Ivanchukov
 NASL stats
 Obituary

1960 births
2007 deaths
American Buddhists
American people of Kalmyk descent
American people of Mongolian descent
American soccer players
American Soccer League (1933–1983) players
Howell High School (New Jersey) alumni
Major Indoor Soccer League (1978–1992) players
North American Soccer League (1968–1984) indoor players
New England Sharks players
North American Soccer League (1968–1984) players
Pennsylvania Stoners players
Philadelphia Fever (MISL) players
People from Howell Township, New Jersey
San Jose Earthquakes (1974–1988) players
Tampa Bay Rowdies draft picks
Tampa Bay Rowdies (1975–1993) players
United States men's youth international soccer players
Kalmyk sportspeople
Pan American Games competitors for the United States
Footballers at the 1979 Pan American Games
Association football defenders